Vegas Oil and Gas S.A. is a company based in Egypt focusing on petroleum exploration and gas exploration.  Headquartered in Athens, but mainly operating from the Cairo suburb of Maadi.

Vegas is wholly owned by the Vardinogiannis family.

Activities
Vegas is also a large E&P group of companies with assets in USA, Egypt and Yemen.

It is 50% shareholder and operator of the NW Gemsa concession, Circle Oil have a 40% interest and Sea Dragon Energy have the remaining 10%. All gas currently produced from the field is flared, due to sub-economic, low volumes.

Vegas is a 35% shareholder in the Alam El Shawish West concession, with Shell Egypt (operator, 40%), GDF Suez 25%.

It is operator and 50% shareholder of the East Ghazalat concession (Western Desert), with TransGlobe Energy Corporation holding the remaining 50%.

Recent news
In August 2013, Vegas announced it had discovered oil, gas and condensate in Egypt.

See also

 Energy in Egypt

References

External links

circleoil.com
seadragon.ca
trans-globe.com
gdfsuez.com
shell.com

Oil and gas companies of Egypt
Multinational companies headquartered in Greece
Greek brands